Slay the Suitors is an album by American drummer/composer Bobby Previte's group Empty Suits. The album was released on the Avant label in 1994.

Reception

The Allmusic site awarded the album 4 stars stating "On the whole, Slay the Suitors is a shake-up, wake-up call to arms in which Bobby Previte faults classicism for not only stifling the artistic impulse, but also for running hand-in-hand with deeply entrenched, even violent forces of oppression. With this theme to guide him on Slay the Suitors, Previte is absolutely at his most uncompromising, and the resulting music -- like the CD cover -- is right on target".

Track listing
All compositions by Bobby Previte.
 "Fantasy and Nocturne" - 16:15
 "Waltz" - 13:39
 "Canon" - 9:41
 "Prelude and Elegy" - 14:32

Personnel
Bobby Previte – drums
Robin Eubanks - trombone, electronics
Wayne Horvitz - Hammond organ, piano, synthesizer
Steve Gaboury - piano, synthesizer, keyboard bass
Jerome Harris - acoustic bass guitar, electric guitar
Roger Squitero - percussion
 Production by Previte and Mark Helias, executive producer John Zorn

References 

Bobby Previte albums
Avant Records albums
1994 albums